Taneli Ronkainen (born 28 March 1995) is a Finnish ice hockey defenceman currently playing for Oulun Kärpät of the Finnish Liiga.

References

External links
 

1995 births
Living people
Oulun Kärpät players
Finnish ice hockey defencemen
People from Kuusamo
Sportspeople from North Ostrobothnia